MacAlpine, McAlpine, MacAlpin or McAlpin is a Scottish surname. It may refer to:

People 

 The Scottish House of Alpin
 Its claimed descendants, the Siol Alpin and/or Clan McAlpin(e)
 Kenneth MacAlpin, founder of said dynasty
 His brother and successor Domnall mac Ailpín
 The McAlpine baronets in the baronetage of the United Kingdom

In arts and entertainment
 Colin McAlpin, English composer
 Donald McAlpine (born 1934), Australian cinematographer
 Fiona McAlpine, British radio drama producer and director
 Jennie McAlpine (born 1984), British actress
 Katherine McAlpine (born 1985), American science writer and science rap performer
 Lizzy McAlpine (born 1999), American singer-songwriter
 Rachel McAlpine (born 1940), writer from New Zealand
 Tony MacAlpine (born 1960), American musician and composer
 William McAlpine (tenor) (1922–2004), Scottish tenor

In business
 Alfred David McAlpine (1881-1944), founder of the construction company Sir Alfred McAlpine & Son, son of Sir Robert McAlpine, 1st Baronet
 Alfred James McAlpine (1908-1991), British businessman, son of the above
 David Hunter McAlpin (1816-1901), founder of McAlpin Tobacco
 Edwin McAlpine, Baron McAlpine of Moffat (1907-1990), British construction magnate, son of Sir Robert McAlpine, 1st Baronet
 Tom McAlpin, president and CEO of Virgin Voyages
 Sir William McAlpine, 6th Baronet (1936-2018), British businessman, older brother of Alistair

In government and politics
 Alistair McAlpine, Baron McAlpine (1942-2014), British politician
 Dave McAlpin, American judge and politician
 Donald McAlpine (politician) (1869-1925), Canadian politician
 Edwin A. McAlpin, General of the New York State Militia
 Gerry McAlpine (born 1939), Canadian politician
 Joan McAlpine (born 1962), Scottish journalist and politician
 John McAlpine (1906–1984), New Zealand politician, Minister of Railways and Minister of Transport
 Robin McAlpine (born 1972), Director of the Common Weal think tank
 Steve McAlpine (born 1949), American lawyer and politician
 Tom McAlpine (1929–2006), Scottish politician

In sport
 C. McAlpine, 19th century footballer for Burslem Port Vale
 Chris McAlpine (born 1971), American retired National Hockey League player
 Ernie McAlpine (1902–1984), Australian rules footballer
 Hamish McAlpine (born 1948), Scottish former football goalkeeper
 Ivan McAlpine (1907-?), Australian rules footballer
 James McAlpine (1901–1975), Scottish footballer
 Jim McAlpine (1887-?), Scottish footballer
 Keidane McAlpine (born 1975), American college soccer coach
 Kenneth McAlpine (chess player) (born 1945), Scottish chess master
 Kenneth McAlpine (cricketer) (1858–1923), English cricketer
 Kenneth McAlpine (born 1920), Formula 1 driver and team owner
 Rob McAlpine (born 1991), Scottish rugby player

In other fields
 Daniel McAlpine (1849–1932), Scottish mycologist
 Douglas McAlpine (1890-1981), neurologist, sixth son of Sir Robert McAlpine, 1st Baronet
 Harry McAlpin (1906-1985), American journalist
 James Francis McAlpine (1922-2019) Canadian entomologist specialising in Diptera 
 Joan McAlpine (born 1962), Scottish journalist and politician
 John Macalpine (died 1557), Scottish Protestant theologian
 Michael McAlpine, associate professor of mechanical engineering at the University of Minnesota
 Sir Robert McAlpine, 1st Baronet, British civil engineer, known as "Concrete Bob"
 Edwin McAlpine, Baron McAlpine of Moffat, British civil engineer, grandson of 1st Baronet
 William H. McAlpine (1847–1905), American Baptist minister and educator
 William J. McAlpine (1812–1890), American civil engineer
 Michael Todd McAlpin, (Born 1952), Commander of the Clan McAlpin(e)

Places 
 MacAlpine (house), a historic home in Maryland
 MacAlpine Hills, a range of hills in Antarctica
 McAlpin, Harrison County, West Virginia
 McAlpin, Raleigh County, West Virginia
 Hotel McAlpin, a hotel in New York City
 McAlpin's, a former department store in Cincinnati, Ohio
 McAlpine Corners, a community in the township of Hastings Highlands, Ontario
 McAlpine Locks and Dam in Louisville, Kentucky
 McAlpine Mountain, a summit in North Carolina
 McAlpine Stadium, the former name of Kirklees Stadium in Huddersfield, England

Fictional  
 Jim McAlpine, socially intrepid protagonist of Morley Callaghan's novel the Loved and the Lost (1951)

Other 
 MV Empire MacAlpine, a merchant aircraft carrier ship
 Tony MacAlpine (album), a music album by Tony MacAlpine
 McAlpin's Corps
 McAlpine's Fusiliers, an Irish ballad
 Sir Robert McAlpine, a British construction firm
 Alfred McAlpine, a defunct British construction firm

Surnames of Scottish origin